Publius Cornelius Dolabella was a Roman senator, who was active during the reign of Nero. He was suffect consul in the nundinium of May to June 55 as the colleague of Seneca the Younger. 

A member of the patrician order, he is likely the son of Publius Cornelius Dolabella, consul in 10; it is also likely he was the father of Servius Cornelius Dolabella Petronianus, consul in 86.

References 

1st-century Romans
Publius (consul 808 AUC)
Roman patricians
Cornelius Dolabella, Publius (808 AUC)